Brenda Judith García Valadez (born 12 February 1996) is a Mexican footballer who plays as a defender for Liga MX Femenil club Club Puebla.

Career
Brenda García was born on 12 February 1996 in Aguascalientes City.

She made her professional debut for Necaxa on 3 May 2017 in a game against Santos Laguna, where she scored Necaxa's first goal ever four minutes into the match. García scored her second goal with Necaxa in the Apertura 2017 tournament in a 1–1 draw with Atlas.

For the 2019–20 season, García was transferred to Cruz Azul, where she has become a fundamental player for the team.

Career statistics

Club

References

External links 
 

1996 births
Living people
Mexican women's footballers
Footballers from Aguascalientes
Mexican footballers
Liga MX Femenil players
Club Necaxa (women) footballers
Cruz Azul (women) footballers
People from Aguascalientes City
Women's association football fullbacks